German submarine U-2322 was a highly advanced Type XXIII U-boat built for Nazi Germany's Kriegsmarine in 1944. U-2322 was one of just a few such boats to undertake an operational patrol, and one of only three to undergo two. During these patrols, she succeeded in sinking a single British freighter, one of five ships sunk by this submarine class.

U-2322 was built at Hamburg in just four months, being ready by July 1944. As a prototype of a new class of boats, she was not ready for active service until 1945, as there were numerous engineering difficulties to contend with and the crew had to be trained to manage the new boat and new operational tactics practised and decided on. When she was finally ready for a war patrol in February 1945, it was more as an experiment into the abilities of the boat than a real attempt to damage allied shipping.

Design
Like all Type XXIII U-boats, U-2322 had a displacement of  when at the surface and  while submerged. The submarine was powered by one MWM six-cylinder RS134S diesel engine providing , one AEG GU4463-8 double-acting electric motor electric motor providing , and one BBC silent running CCR188 electric motor providing .

U-2322 was fitted with two  torpedo tubes in the bow. She could carry two preloaded torpedoes. The complement was 14–18 men. This class of U-boat did not carry a deck gun.

Service history
Leaving Horten Naval Base in Norway on the 6 February 1945, U-2322 proceeded to the East coast of Scotland, particularly in the area of St Abb's Head, where lone coastal shipping sometimes passed, believing that German U-boats would not bother waiting in such a dangerous spot for such insignificant prey. This plan finally worked on the 25 February, when the 1,317 GRT steam merchant Egholm was sunk by a torpedo. This first and only success for U-2322 was achieved in the dark off Holy Island. The rest of this patrol was unsuccessful.

The second patrol, off East Anglia in April was totally fruitless, powerful allied escorts and well-organised convoys effectively cutting off the small U-boats from their potential targets. The only advantage gained in these patrols was that no Type XXIII boat was lost in the North Sea, all losses coming in German waters from indirect sources like accident, bombing raids and naval mines.

When Germany surrendered, U-2322 was at Stavanger in Norway, from where it sailed to Loch Ryan in Scotland for disposal in Operation Deadlight. Towed out to sea on the 27 November, the unmaintained and rusting boat was destroyed as a naval gunnery target.

Summary of raiding history

References

Bibliography

External links
 

World War II submarines of Germany
Type XXIII submarines
Operation Deadlight
U-boats commissioned in 1944
1944 ships
Ships built in Hamburg
U-boats sunk in 1945
Ships sunk as targets
Maritime incidents in November 1945